Eastern Counties 5 was an English level 13 Rugby Union league with teams from Cambridgeshire, Essex, Norfolk and Suffolk taking part.  Promoted teams used to move up to Eastern Counties 4 and relegation was to Eastern Counties 6 until that division was cancelled at the end of the 1991–92 season.  After ten seasons Eastern Counties 5 was cancelled at the end of the 1996–97 campaign.

Original teams
When league rugby began in 1987 this division contained the following teams:

Bancroft
Dereham
Haverhill & District 
London Hospital
Loughton
March
Norwich Union
Old Brentwoods
Orwell
Sawston
Swaffham
Thurston

Eastern Counties 5 honours

Eastern Counties 5 (1987–1993)

The original Eastern Counties 5 was a tier 12 league with promotion up to Eastern Counties 4 and relegation down to Eastern Counties 6 until that division was cancelled at the end of the 1991–92 season.

Eastern Counties 5 (1993–1996)

The creation of National 5 South meant that Eastern Counties 5 dropped from a tier 12 league to a tier 13 league for the years that National 5 South was active.  Promotion continued to Eastern Counties 4 and there was no relegation.

Eastern Counties 5 (1996–1997)

The cancellation of National 5 South at the end of the 1995–96 season meant that Eastern Counties 5 once more became a tier 12 league.  Promotion continued to Eastern Counties 4 and there was no relegation.  At the end of the 1996–97 Eastern Counties 5 was discontinued and all teams transferred into Eastern Counties 4.

Number of league titles

Bancroft (1)
Dereham (1)
Haverhill & District (1)
London Hospital (1)
May & Baker (1)
Mersea Island (1)
Millwall (1)
Norwich Union (1)
Ongar (1)
Sawston (1)

See also
London & SE Division RFU
Eastern Counties RU
Essex RFU
English rugby union system
Rugby union in England

Notes

References

Defunct rugby union leagues in England
Rugby union in Essex
Rugby union in Cambridgeshire
Rugby union in Norfolk
Rugby union in Suffolk